This article lists the squads for the 2022 COSAFA Women's Championship, the 10th edition of the COSAFA Women's Championship. The tournament is a women's international football tournament for national teams organised by COSAFA, teams from Southern Africa, and was held in Nelson Mandela Bay from 31 August to 11 September 2022. In the tournament were involved twelve national teams: eleven teams from COSAFA and one team from CECAFA, who were invited as guests. Each national team registered a squad of 20 players.

The age listed for each player is on 31 August 2022, the first day of the tournament. The numbers of caps and goals listed for each player do not include any matches played after the start of tournament. The club listed is the club for which the player last played a competitive match prior to the tournament. The nationality for each club reflects the national association (not the league) to which the club is affiliated. A flag is included for coaches that are of a different nationality than their own national team.

Group A

Angola 
Coach:Souza Garcia
 Caps and goals accurate up to and including 7 April 2021.

Mauritius 
Coach: Anielle Collet

The squad was announced on 22 August 2022.

Mozambique 
Coach: Luís Victor Fumo

The squad was announced on 26 August 2022.

South Africa 
Coach: Simphiwe Dludlu

The squad was announced on 16 August 2022.

Group B

Eswatini 
Coach:Simephi Mamba

Lesotho 
Coach:Pule Khojane

Namibia 
Coach:Paulus Shipanga

 Caps and goals accurate up to and including 6 April 2021.

Zambia
Coach: Bruce Mwape

Group C

Botswana 
Coach:Gaoletlhoo Nkutlwisang

Comoros
Coach:Mohamed Bouhari

Malawi
Coach:Thom Mkolongo

Tanzania 
Coach:Bakari Shime

References

2022